Arthur Ford may refer to:

 Arthur Ford (psychic) (1897–1971), American psychic, spiritual medium and clairaudient
 Arthur Ford (Australian footballer) (1881–1953), Australian rules footballer
 Arthur Ford (footballer, born 1911) (1911–?), English association footballer
 Arthur Ford (journalist) (1886–1968), Canadian journalist
 Arthur C. Ford (1892–1985), water commissioner NYC
 Arthur Ford (geologist), surveyor responsible for naming mountains such as Anderson Summit
 Arthur Ford (wrestler) (1903–?), Australian Olympic wrestler
 Arthur Ford, protagonist of VR game Boneworks